Christoffer Aspgren (born 20 September 1995) is a Swedish footballer who plays as a midfielder for Sandvikens IF.

References

External links
  (archive)
  (archive)

1995 births
Living people
Association football midfielders
Gefle IF players
Swedish footballers
Allsvenskan players